Red Talons Tribebook is a 1995 role-playing game supplement for Werewolf: The Apocalypse published by White Wolf Publishing.

Contents
Red Talons Tribebook provides the history of the tribe seen through their own eyes: the tribe's customs and beliefs, their unique gifts and some templates for various tribal members.

Reception
Mark Barter reviewed Red Talons Tribebook for Arcane magazine, rating it a 7 out of 10 overall. Barter comments that "This material is not essential to play the game, but it brings more life and colour to the most intriguing of the tribes. You, a human, will play the role of a wolf who lives to slaughter humans in revenge for their slaughter of wolves, and see your own species from a different perspective. For me, this is the epitome of what makes roleplaying so challenging and inspiring."

Reviews
Dragão Brasil #58 (Jan 2000)

References

External links
Guide du Rôliste Galactique

Role-playing game books
Role-playing game supplements introduced in 1995
Werewolf: The Apocalypse